Richard Noel Holdaway is ornithologist in New Zealand. With a doctorate in avian palaeobiology and systematics and a BSc in neurophysiology and ornithology, he has studied birds for three decades primarily in New Zealand. In 2003 he received (together with Trevor Worthy) the 2003 D. L. Serventy Medal Holdaway is director (and owner) of Palaecol Research Ltd in Christchurch, New Zealand. He was recognized for his findings (together with Chris Jacomb) on the extinction of the New Zealand terrestrial megafauna by the University of Otago. His work has also appeared in the New Zealand Journal of Zoology, Nature Communications, the US National Library of Medicine, National Institutes of Health and Royal Society Publishing among others.

References

Living people
New Zealand ornithologists
Year of birth missing (living people)
University of Canterbury alumni
People associated with Department of Scientific and Industrial Research (New Zealand)